Lostwithiel is an electoral division of Cornwall in the United Kingdom and returns one member to sit on Cornwall Council. The current Councillor is Colin Martin, a Liberal Democrat.

Extent
Lostwithiel covers the town of Lostwithiel, the villages of Lanlivery and Lerryn, and the hamlets of Sweetshouse, Redmoor, No Man's Land, Ponts Mill, Milltown, Downend, Bofarnel, Fairy Cross, Penpoll, St Veep, Manely, Couch's Mill, West Taphouse and Middle Taphouse. The division covers 8,855 hectares in total.

Election results

2017 election

2013 election

2009 election

References

Lostwithiel
Electoral divisions of Cornwall Council